Peço Kagjini was an Albanian politician and mayor of Tirana from 1951 through 1952.

References

Year of birth missing
Possibly living people
Mayors of Tirana